Alternative music may refer to the following types of music:

Alternative rock
Alternative pop
Alternative R&B
Neo soul, sometimes known as alternative soul
Alternative reggaeton
Alternative hip hop
Alternative dance
Alternative metal
Christian alternative rock
Indie folk, sometimes referred to as alternative folk
Alternative country

See also 
 Alternative (disambiguation)

1970s neologisms
Music by genre